Reece Horn (born February 1, 1993) is an American football wide receiver for the Frankfurt Galaxy. He played college football at University of Indianapolis. He spent time in camp with three NFL teams, the Tennessee Titans, Miami Dolphins, Cincinnati Bengals. He also played for the Vienna Vikings in the Austrian Football League and the Milano Seamen in the Italian Football League.

College career
Horn played at the University of Indianapolis from 2012 to 2015. He played in 48 career games, recording 272 catches for 3,562 yards and 31 touchdowns.

Professional career

Tennessee Titans 
Horn went undrafted in the 2016 NFL Draft. On June 3, 2016, Horn signed with the Tennessee Titans. On August 28, 2016, Horn was released by the Titans.

Milano Seamen 
In 2017, Horn signed with Milano Seamen in the Italian Football League. He had 62 receptions, 1,142 yards, and 12 touchdowns for the season in 11 games. Winning the Italian Bowl championship.

Vienna Vikings
On December 30, 2017, Horn signed with the Vienna Vikings.  In the 2018 season with Vienna, Horn had 50 receptions,	771 yards, 15 Touchdowns in 12 games. The Vikings lost to the Swarco Raiders Tirol in the 2018 Austrian Bowl, the Austrian Football League championship final.

Memphis Express 
In 2019, Horn joined the Memphis Express for the season. He had 28 catches on 42 targets, 429 yards, and one touchdown in 7 games played.

Miami Dolphins 
On April 9, 2019, Horn signed with the Miami Dolphins. On August 31, 2019, Horn was released by the Dolphins.

Tampa Bay Vipers
Horn was drafted with the 60th pick in the 8th round of the 2020 XFL Draft by the Tampa Bay Vipers of the XFL. He had 27 receptions, 240 yards, and one touchdown. He had his contract terminated when the league suspended operations on April 10, 2020.

Horn signed with the Linemen of The Spring League in May 2021. He led the team to win the league championship as the top receiver.

Cincinnati Bengals
Horn was signed by the Cincinnati Bengals on July 26, 2021. He was waived on August 16, 2021.

Calgary Stampeders
Horn signed with the Calgary Stampeders of the CFL on February 1, 2022. Horn was released by the Stampeders during final roster cuts on June 4, 2022.

Frankfurt Galaxy
Horn was signed by the Frankfurt Galaxy of the  European League of Football during the season. In final 8 games Horn played in the regular season, he had 39 receptions for 683 yards and 11 touchdowns. The Galaxy finished the season with an 8-4 record.

Career statistics

References

External links
Calgary Stampeders bio

Further reading

1993 births
Living people
People from Carmel, Indiana
Players of American football from Indiana
American football wide receivers
Indianapolis Greyhounds football players
Tennessee Titans players
Memphis Express (American football) players
Miami Dolphins players
Tampa Bay Vipers players
American expatriate players of American football
American expatriate sportspeople in Italy
American expatriate sportspeople in Austria
The Spring League players
Cincinnati Bengals players
Calgary Stampeders players
Frankfurt Galaxy (ELF) players